The Pieve di Sant'Andrea is an 11th-century pieve or rural church in Cercina, Tuscany, central Italy.

Initiated in Romanesque style, it was later remade. It has a sturdy bell tower with single and double mullioned windows. The interior is on a nave, and houses fragments of 14th-century frescoes (St. Anthony and one Female Saint). Other painting works include a Virgin Enthonred with Child between Sts. Andrew and John the Baptist (16th century), the Resurrection of Christ between Sts. Anthony of Padua, Mary Magdalene, Catherine of Alexandria and Jesm by Francesco Curradi, and two panels with a Nativity between Sts. Lucy and Jerome and Massacre of the Innocents.

The marble baptismal font dates to 1613, while the stoup, also in marble, is from 1540.

References

Romanesque architecture in Tuscany
11th-century Roman Catholic church buildings in Italy
Churches in the metropolitan city of Florence
Paintings depicting John the Baptist
Paintings of the Resurrection of Christ
Paintings depicting Mary Magdalene
Paintings of Anthony of Padua
Paintings of Catherine of Alexandria
Nativity of Jesus in art
Paintings of Jerome
Paintings of Saint Lucy
Paintings of Saint Barbara
Paintings of Anthony the Great